The Apostolic Vicariate of Puerto Princesa is a Latin Church missionary jurisdiction or apostolic vicariate of the Catholic Church located in the Province of Palawan, Philippines. Its cathedra is within Immaculate Conception Cathedral in the episcopal see of Puerto Princesa City, Palawan, Philippines. It is not a part of an ecclesiastical province as it is directly exempt to the Holy See, specifically the Congregation for the Evangelization of Peoples, yet for the purpose of apostolic cooperation usually grouped with the Archdiocese of Manila, along with the Roman Catholic Apostolic Vicariate of Taytay. The current Vicar Apostolic is Bishop Socrates Calamba Mesiona MSP, DD.

History 
The establishment as prefectura apostolica was announced and celebrated on April 10, 1910, a great day among the Recollect priests. In the bull of the founding of Pope Pius X entitled "Novas Erigere Diocese" (Newly established Dioceses) the Prefectura Apostolica de Palawan was mentioned along with the elevated levels of the Diocese of Lipa, Tuguegarao, Zamboanga and Calbayog. The prefectura apostolica is administered by the Sacred Congregation of the Propagation of Faith to the Recollect priests as stated in Protocol No. 837/910 on May 13, 1910, sent by Father Girolamo Maria Cotti, the prefect, and Luigi Veccia, the secretary.

On July 3, 1955, Rome declared the elevation of the prefectura apostolica to the Apostolic Vicariate of Palawan (AVP) by a bull entitled "Ad Christi Regnum" (The Reign of Christ) signed by Pope Pius XII. Bishop Gregorio Espiga and Infante, D.D., was the first Apostolic Vicar of Palawan. He became bishop on September 10, 1955, in the church of San Sebastian, Manila, as Titular Bishop of Afneo. He formally took office on September 18, 1955.

On March 27, 2002, it was renamed as the Apostolic Vicariate of Puerto Princesa and lost part of its territory when the Apostolic Vicariate of Taytay was established.

Coat of arms

The two lilies represent Saint Joseph, the patron saint whom the founding Augustinian Recollect fathers dedicated the local church of Palawan. The crescent represents the Immaculate Conception, the patroness of the cathedral. The fort actually represents the fort of Cuyo, where the first missionary arrived on August 1622, as well as the other ports in the province of Palawan built by the Augustinian Recollect fathers to protect their mission and their faithful from depredations of the Moros from the south.

List of ordinaries
The early ordinaries were missionary members of the order of Augustinian Recollects (O.A.R.)
 Apostolic prefects of Palawan
 Friar Victoriano Romàn Zárate di S. Giuseppe, O.A.R. (April 21, 1911 – 1938)
 Friar Leandro Nieto y Bolandier, O.A.R. (November 25, 1938 – 1953)
 Gregorio Espiga y Infante, O.A.R. (1953 – July 3, 1955; see below)

 Apostolic vicars of Palawan
 Gregorio Espiga y Infante, O.A.R. (July 3, 1955 – 1987; see above) 
 Francisco Capiral San Diego (1987–1995) – previously Coadjutor Vicar Apostolic of Palawan (June 6, 1983 – December 18, 1987).
 Pedro D. Arigo (February 23, 1996 – March 27, 2002; see below)

 Apostolic vicars of Puerto Princesa

See also 
 Roman Catholicism in the Philippines
 List of Roman Catholic dioceses in the Philippines
 Catholic Church hierarchy

References

External links 

 
 GCatholic, with incumbent ordinaties list and linking biographies
 Catholic-Hierarchy.org

1955 establishments in the Philippines
1955 in Christianity
Christian organizations established in 1955
Puerto Princesa
Religion in Palawan
Roman Catholic dioceses in the Philippines
Roman Catholic dioceses and prelatures established in the 20th century